Tower Center International is a class A office building in Bucharest. It has 26 floors, with a total of  floor space.
It is located near Victory Square, or 1 Mai zone.

The original building project had 21 storey floors and 3 level basement, however, the constructor has built one more floor. The city hall has stopped the works to remake the permit.

The structure has a height regime of 3S + P + 22/f + 3Etehn.

See also
List of tallest buildings in Romania

References

External links
Official site
NORC Street View Imagery

Skyscraper office buildings in Bucharest
Office buildings completed in 2008